Acantholespesia is a genus of flies in the family Tachinidae.

Species
Acantholespesia comstocki (Williston, 1889)
Acantholespesia signata (Aldrich & Webber, 1924)
Acantholespesia texana (Aldrich & Webber, 1924)

References

Diptera of North America
Exoristinae
Tachinidae genera